Galle ( gālla distrikkaya;  Kāli māvattam) is a district in Southern Province, Sri Lanka. It is one of 25 districts of Sri Lanka, the second level administrative division of the country. The district is administered by a District Secretariat headed by a District Secretary (previously known as a Government Agent) appointed by the central government of Sri Lanka.

Geological background 
Galle District bounded on the north by Benthara river, south and west by the Indian Ocean and east by Matara and Ratnapura districts. The topography of Galle District is very much dissent. The climatic condition of Hiniduma Patthuwa is very similar to the central hill country of Sri Lanka. This area consists of rainforests, which is the water catchment area for most of the rivers and lakes flows across Galle District. Sinharaja Forest Reserve is one of them. Galle district lies in a temperate climatic zone.

Annual rainfall is between 2000–2500mm. It passes Neluwa, Thawalama, Nagoda Baddegama and Thelikada areas. It flows to the Indian Ocean in Ginthota area of Galle District. The river Madu Ganga starts from Polathu Kanda and flows to the sea from Balapitiya and helps to maintain ecological balance in the Galle district.

Historical background 

In the ancient Sri Lanka, Galle District secured an important place in the battles against enemies as the capital city of Southern Province. Ancient legends reveal that in 1072 A.C. king Vijayabahu I started his battle against "Soli" in Thambalagamuwa of Hinidum Pattu. According to legends, during the reign of king Dambhadeniya Parakramabahu carried out his battle agents Queen Sugala in the Galle District. Galle was a very important area during the reign of King Maha Parakramabahu and it very much helped the Dutch, Portuguese and English establish their kingdoms.

Galle was called "Gimhathitha." The Sinhalese pronunciation "Gaala" derived from the word "gala" (stone). Gala implies meeting place of bullock carts. Later it was pronounced as "Gaala" as there were large rock and hills in the district.

Cultural background 
A number of individuals from the Galle district have made significant contributions to Sinhala literature. Thotagamuwa Vijayaba pirivena, which was a famous educational institute in Kotte era, produced a number of notable scholars. Hikkaduwe Sri Sumangala Thera, Migettuwatte Gunananda Thera, Martin Wickramasinghe, Nandadasa Kodagoda, Edwin Ariyadasa, M. B. Ariyapala, Gunadasa Amarasekera, D. J. Wimalasurendra, Senarath Paranavithana, A. T. Ariyaratne, Sirimal Ranawella and Ariyapala Gurunnanse are a number of notable residents of Galle.

The Galle Literary Festival is run each January.

Demographics

Religion

 

94% of the population are Buddhists, 4.7% Muslim, 1.5% Hindu and 0.9% Christian.

Major cities

 Galle (Galle Municipal Council)

Suburbs of Galle

 Karapitiya
 Unawatuna

Urban Councils

 Ambalangoda (Ambalangoda Urban Council)
 Hikkaduwa (Hikkaduwa Urban Council)

Main Towns

 Ahangama
 Ahungalla
 Ambalangoda
 Baddegama
 Balapitiya
 Batapola
 Bentota
 Boossa
 Elpitiya
 Habaraduwa
 Hiniduma
 Hikkaduwa
 Imaduwa
 Karandeniya
 Koggala
 Kosgoda
 Mapalagama
 Nagoda
 Neluwa
 Pitigala
 Rathgama
 Thawalama
 Udugama
 Uragasmanhandiya
 Unawatuna
 Wanduramba
 Yakkalamulla

World Heritage Sites

 Galle fort
 Sinharaja Forest Reserve

Forest reserves

 Hiyare Forest Reserve
Kanneliya Forest Reserve

Maps
Galle and vicinity in map of Sri Lanka

References

External links 
 Thelikada

 
Districts of Sri Lanka